The 12993/12994 Gandhidham - Puri Weekly Superfast Express is a Superfast Express train belonging to Indian Railways that runs between Gandhidham Junction and Puri via Sambalpur.

It is currently being operated with 12993/12994 train numbers on a weekly basis. This train was announced in the 2011 rail budget.

Coach Composition

The train has standard ICF rakes with max speed of 110 kmph. The train consists of 19 coaches :

 1 AC II Tier
 2 AC III Tier
 8 Sleeper Coaches
 6 General Unreserved
 2 Seating cum Luggage Rake

Service

The 12993/Gandhidham - Puri Weekly Superfast Express has an average speed of 55 km/hr and covers 2285 km in 41 hrs 30 mins.

The 12994/Puri - Gandhidham Weekly Superfast Express has an average speed of 55 km/hr and covers 2285 km in 41 hrs 15 mins.

Route and halts 

The important halts of the train are:

Schedule

Direction Reversal

Train reverses its direction one time at:

Traction

It is hauled by a Diesel Loco Shed, Vatva based WDM-3A or WDM-3D from Gandhidham to Ahmedabad. After Ahmedabad, an Electric Loco Shed, Vadodara based WAP-4E hauls the train from Ahmedabad to Puri and vice versa.

See also

 Gandhidham - Puri Weekly Express

References

Transport in Puri
Transport in Gandhidham
Railway services introduced in 2011
Express trains in India
Rail transport in Odisha
Rail transport in Maharashtra
Rail transport in Chhattisgarh
Transport in Kutch district